Ben Stawski (born 5 June 1990) is a badminton player from England. He graduated from Loughborough College with a Foundation Degree in Sports Science in 2010. In 2009, he won bronze medals at the European Junior Badminton Championships in team and mixed doubles event.

Achievements

European Junior Championships 
Mixed doubles

BWF International Challenge/Series (2 titles, 5 runners-up) 
Men's doubles

Mixed doubles

  BWF International Challenge tournament
  BWF International Series tournament
  BWF Future Series tournament

References

External links 
 

1990 births
Living people
Sportspeople from Nuneaton
English male badminton players